The 2013 Dollar General 200 fueled by AmeriGas was the second stock car race of the 2013 NASCAR Nationwide Series and the eighth iteration of the event. The race was held on Saturday, March 2, 2013, in Avondale, Arizona at Phoenix International Raceway, a 1-mile (1.6 km) permanent low-banked tri-oval race track. The race took the scheduled 200 laps to complete. At race's end, Joe Gibbs Racing driver Kyle Busch would dominate the weekend to win his 52nd career NASCAR Nationwide Series win and his first of the season. To fill out the podium, Brad Keselowski of Penske Racing and Justin Allgaier of Turner Scott Motorsports would finish second and third, respectively.

Background 

Phoenix International Raceway – also known as PIR – is a one-mile, low-banked tri-oval race track located in Avondale, Arizona. It is named after the nearby metropolitan area of Phoenix. The motorsport track opened in 1964 and currently hosts two NASCAR race weekends annually. PIR has also hosted the IndyCar Series, CART, USAC and the Rolex Sports Car Series. The raceway is currently owned and operated by International Speedway Corporation.

The raceway was originally constructed with a 2.5 mi (4.0 km) road course that ran both inside and outside of the main tri-oval. In 1991 the track was reconfigured with the current 1.51 mi (2.43 km) interior layout. PIR has an estimated grandstand seating capacity of around 67,000. Lights were installed around the track in 2004 following the addition of a second annual NASCAR race weekend.

Entry list 

*Withdrew.

Practice

First practice 
The first practice session was held on Friday, March 1, at 10:00 AM MST, and would last for an hour and 20 minutes.

Second and final practice 
The second and final practice session, sometimes referred to as Happy Hour, was held on Friday, March 1, at 1:35 PM MST, and would last for 50 minutes.

Qualifying 
Qualifying was held on Saturday, March 2, at 11:35 AM MST. Each driver would have two laps to set a fastest time; the fastest of the two would count as their official qualifying lap.

No drivers would fail to qualify.

Full qualifying results

Race results

References 

2013 NASCAR Nationwide Series
NASCAR races at Phoenix Raceway
March 2013 sports events in the United States
2013 in sports in Arizona